QUE or que may refer to:

 Quebec (Que.), as the traditional abbreviation, though the postal abbreviations are now QC and previously PQ
 Que Publishing, a company which first began as a publisher of technical computer software and hardware support books
 Garmin iQue, a line of products combining PDA devices with integrated GPS receivers
 Trademark of Plastic Logic for an electronic reading device
 Que (tower), a freestanding gate tower characteristic of the tomb architectural ensembles during China's Han Dynasty
 Qué!, a Spanish newspaper
 Quwê, an Assyrian vassal state or province at various times from the 9th century BC to shortly after the death of Ashurbanipal around 627 BCE in the lowlands of eastern Cilicia
 An informal term for a member of Omega Psi Phi fraternity, a historically African American Greek-letter fraternity
 London Underground station code for Queensway tube station
 MRT station abbreviation for Queenstown MRT station

See also
 
 
 Queue (disambiguation)
 Cue (disambiguation)
 Q (disambiguation)
 What (disambiguation)
 Quebec (disambiguation)
 QC (disambiguation)